Barry J. Naughton is the So Kwanlok Chair of Chinese International Affairs at the Graduate School of International Relations and Pacific Studies at the University of California, San Diego.  He specializes in the modern Chinese economy and is a recognized expert in the field.  His 1995 book "Growing Out of the Plan: Chinese Economic Reform, 1978–1993" won the Masayoshi Ohira Memorial Prize. He stated that the Chinese economic reform was accomplished without a grand vision. Rather, it was the result of a mix between laissez-faire and experimentation with business incentives by the government.

Background
He received his Ph.D. in Economics and M.A. in International Relations from Yale University in 1986, and a B.A., Chinese Language and Literature from the University of Washington.

Notable analysis 
Naughton concludes that China's process of rural collectivization proceeded smoothly in part because, unlike the Soviet experience, a network of state institutions already existed in the countryside.

Select books
The Chinese Economy: Transitions and Growth, 2007
The Chinese Economy: Adaption and Growth, second edition of The Chinese Economy, 2018
China: Adapting the Past, Confronting the Future, (with Thomas Buoye, Kirk Denton, and Bruce Dickson), 2002.
Growing Out of the Plan: Chinese Economic Reform, 1978-1993, 1995.
Holding China Together: Diversity and National Integration in the Post-Deng Era, (with Dali L. Yang), 2004.
Reforming Asian Socialism: The Growth of Market Institutions, (with John McMillan), 1996.
Urban Spaces in Contemporary China: The Potential for Autonomy and Community in Post-Mao China, (with Deborah S. Davis, Richard Kraus, and Elizabeth J. Perry), 1995.
The China Circle: Economics and Electronics in the Prc, Taiwan, and Hong Kong, 1997.
China's financial reform: Achievements and challenges, 1998.
Intellectual property rights in China: Evolving business and legal frameworks, 1999.
State investment in post-Mao China: The decline of central control, 1983.

References

External links
Association of Professional Schools of International Affairs
School of International Relations and Pacific Studies
University of California, San Diego

University of California, San Diego faculty
Living people
Year of birth missing (living people)